The streak-backed antshrike (Thamnophilus insignis) is a species of bird in the family Thamnophilidae.
It is found in Venezuela and adjacent parts of Guyana and northern Brazil.

Its natural habitat is subtropical or tropical moist montane forests.

References

streak-backed antshrike
Birds of the Tepuis
streak-backed antshrike
streak-backed antshrike
streak-backed antshrike
Taxonomy articles created by Polbot